The U.S. Grant Bridge is the name of the two bridges that carry and have carried traffic on U.S. Route 23 between Portsmouth, Ohio and South Portsmouth, Kentucky (just west of the city of South Shore) across the Ohio River in the United States.  The original suspension bridge was closed and demolished in 2001 and the replacement cable-stayed bridge opened on October 16, 2006.

Current U.S. Grant Bridge

Contracts for the new U.S. Grant Bridge were given in the spring of 2001. Construction was expected to be complete in June 2004, but work fell behind schedule due to inclement weather, unusual flooding of the Ohio River, and the partial sinking of a floating construction barge which carried one of the cranes used to work on the center span of the bridge. The date of completion was moved to October 16, 2006.

In addition, many downtown business owners were upset over the delays and often criticized the construction company, C.J. Mahan Construction Company, for delays on days when it was sunny and the river levels were average. The bridge was critically underdesigned and not constructible until C.J. Mahan stopped construction and awaited a near complete redesign by the design consultant. Another complaint was that this is the first major bridge project the construction company that was awarded the construction contract has worked on. However, C.J. Mahan has constructed other large bridges in Ohio and West Virginia. Local business owners demanded that ODOT pay local businesses $8 million in lost profit.

Original U.S. Grant Bridge

The original U.S. Grant Bridge was a suspension bridge.  The bridge opened to traffic as a toll bridge in 1927. It wasn't until 1974 when the Ohio Department of Transportation bought the bridge from the Ohio Bridge Commission and removed the tolls.  After an inspection found serious deterioration of its suspension cables, the U.S. Grant Bridge closed for repairs over an 18-month period from 1978 to 1979. In order to improve capacity and to add redundancy for vehicular traffic to cross the Ohio River at Portsmouth, a new bridge was proposed downstream from the U.S. Grant Bridge. The proposed bridge would be named the Carl Perkins Bridge and would open to traffic in 1988. In addition, the Jesse Stuart Memorial Bridge, an additional bridge over the Greenup Lock and Dam upstream from the U.S. Grant Bridge, would open to traffic in 1984.

In 1992, ODOT initiated a long-range study to determine whether to continue to rehabilitate the existing bridge or construct a new span. ODOT had spent $9 million from 1977 to 1996 by the time the study was completed to rehabilitate portions of the bridge. According to the study, rehabilitating the span would add only 20 useful years to the suspension bridge before rehabilitation would need to occur again and would cost nearly $30 million. It was found not cost-efficient to continuously rehabilitate the suspension bridge when a new structure would be cheaper in the long-run.  The bridge continued to age and once again closed from repairs in 1994.

It was listed on the National Register of Historic Places on May 31, 2001, as General U.S. Grant Bridge. It was deemed "significant as it represents the first private toll bridge across the Ohio River between Wheeling, West Virginia and Cincinnati, Ohio, and as such provided a strategic vehicular transportation link between southern Ohio and northeastern Kentucky. The U.S. Grant Bridge was also Ohio's first north-south automobile link crossing the Ohio River between Cincinnati and Ironton and today stands as an important engineering achievement associated with the development of early motoring and interstate commerce."  It was also deemed notable for "the role the General U. S. Grant Bridge design occupies in the career of David B. Steinman. Steinman, a principal in the engineering consulting firm of Robinson and Steinman, ranked among the nation's prominent early 20th century suspension bridge design firms. Steinman achieved national renown as a bridge designer and author during his long career from 1914 until his death in 1960. His General U. S. Grant Bridge was the second American suspension bridge built with a continuous stiffening truss and the first American suspension bridge with towers of the rocker type (ENR, pp. 622-623). The sand-filled anchorages were equally innovative."

On July 3, 2001, the original suspension bridge was permanently closed to traffic and the entire structure was torn down within a few months.

See also

 List of crossings of the Ohio River

References

External links
 C.J. Mahan Construction Company, contractors for the new U.S. Grant Bridge
 U.S. Grant Bridge at Bridges & Tunnels
 U.S. Grant Bridge (Demolished) at Bridges & Tunnels

Road bridges on the National Register of Historic Places in Ohio
U.S. Grant Bridge
U.S. Grant Bridge
Bridges in Greenup County, Kentucky
U.S. Grant Bridge
Cable-stayed bridges in the United States
Road bridges on the National Register of Historic Places in Kentucky
Towers in Kentucky
Towers in Ohio
Bridges over the Ohio River
Transportation in Scioto County, Ohio
National Register of Historic Places in Scioto County, Ohio
U.S. Route 23
Bridges of the United States Numbered Highway System
Former toll bridges in Kentucky
Former toll bridges in Ohio
Portsmouth, Ohio
National Register of Historic Places in Greenup County, Kentucky
Demolished bridges in the United States
Suspension bridges in the United States